Nedward may refer to:
 Ned Ward (1667–1731), English writer
 Ned Flanders, character in The Simpsons